The Skin is a 1981 Italian war film directed by Liliana Cavani and starring Marcello Mastroianni, Burt Lancaster, Ken Marshall, Carlo Giuffrè and Claudia Cardinale from Curzio Malaparte's book La pelle (The Skin). It was entered into the 1981 Cannes Film Festival.

Plot
Naples, 1944. General Mark Clark, commander of the United States Fifth Army, is negotiating with Eduardo Marzullo, a Camorra mobster, the delivery of 112 German soldiers captured during the four days of insurrection. Marzullo demands from the Americans a bribe of one hundred lire per kilo, susceptible to strong increases if not quickly paid, for each prisoner. The intermediary is the Italian liaison captain Curzio Malaparte who is also given the task of pleasing the aviator wife of an American senator, and of organizing a Renaissance style dinner that has as its highlight a fish: a "siren" of the Naples aquarium which looks like a cooked child.

Meanwhile in the slums, mothers sell their children as prostitutes to the Moroccan soldiers, and Jim, the young American liaison captain friend of Malaparte, falls in love with a young girl. He discovers she is being exposed by her father for a fee as the only virgin existing in the city. Malaparte moves in this "hell on earth" scenario with detachment. He tries to explain to the woman, during an orgy of homosexuals, that it is the corrupting power of the Americans which has so reduced the moral qualms of the starving people of the city, who are now severely impoverished by the war.

Vesuvius suddenly breaks out in an eruption, during which the aviator undergoes a cruel rape experience from a group of drunken and upset soldiers, an experience that brings her to the same level of all the other innocent and defeated women around her.

The story ends with the arrival of the Fifth Army in Rome through the Appian Way. Among the crowd that welcomes the Americans, and amidst the enthusiasm of the liberation, a poor man ends up crushed under a military tank.

Cast
 Marcello Mastroianni - Curzio Malaparte
 Burt Lancaster - Gen. Mark Cork
 Claudia Cardinale - Princess Consuelo Caracciolo
 Ken Marshall - Jimmy Wren
 Alexandra King - Deborah Wyatt
 Carlo Giuffrè - Eduardo Mazzullo
 Yann Babilée - Jean-Louis
 Jeanne Valérie - Princess in Capri
 Liliana Tari - Maria Concetta
 Peppe Barra - Taylorman (as Giuseppe Barra)
 Cristina Donadio - Friend of Anna
 Rosaria Della Femmina - Jimmy's lover (as Maria Rosaria Della Femmina)
 Jacques Sernas - Gen. Guillaume
 Gianni Abbate
 Anna Maria Ackermann
 Richard E. Carr - PVT Kaminski

References

External links

 Filmografia di Liliana Cavani Detailed information on the film and its director.

1981 films
Italian war drama films
1980s Italian-language films
English-language Italian films
1980s English-language films
Films set in Naples
Films directed by Liliana Cavani
Films scored by Lalo Schifrin
1980s war drama films
1981 drama films
Italian World War II films
Curzio Malaparte
1980s Italian films